Patricia M. Fraser is a New Zealand soil scientist at Crown Research Institute Plant & Food Research in Lincoln. Her work focuses on the role of earthworms in the soil, and nitrate leaching, to further understand soil quality in cropping systems. She won a 2020 New Zealand Woman of Influence Award in the Rural category.

Education 
Fraser grew up on a mixed cropping farm on the Black Isle in Scotland. She completed a BSc at the University of Aberdeen in 1988, followed by a PhD from the Department of Soil and Physical Sciences at Lincoln University in 1992. Her doctoral thesis was titled The fate of nitrogen under an animal urine patch, and was supervised by Keith Cameron and Rob Sherlock.

Research 

Fraser researches nitrate leaching, cropping systems and the role of earthworms in soil quality. 

Fraser has played a significant role in the New Zealand Society of Soil Science for many years. She has been a member since 1989, and was Secretary for 20 years, Vice-President for two years, and President from 2012 to 2014. She was the first woman president of the society.

Awards 
Fraser was awarded the Norman Taylor Memorial Award for Outstanding Service to NZ Soil Science in 2009. In 2015 Fraser was awarded the Researcher of the Year Award by the Foundation for Arable Research. She is a Fellow and a life member of the New Zealand Society of Soil Science.

Fraser won the Rural category of the Woman of Influence Awards in 2020. Her collaborative approach and unusual ability to communicate science to farmers were lauded by the judges. 

On receiving the award, Fraser said “I never think of myself as a trailblazer, but in retrospect what I’ve done out of passion and interest did make an impact on the communities that I serve. When I first started as a soil scientist almost 30 years ago, the rural community was extremely dominated by men. I knew I must prove myself through the quality of my work. I attended many field days to communicate my findings and educate farmers on how to improve soil health. Gradually they’ve come around, and they now value and respect me for the work I’ve done.”

Selected research

References

External links 
Podcast: It's not just dirt

New Zealand women scientists
New Zealand soil scientists
Lincoln University (New Zealand) alumni
Year of birth missing (living people)
Living people
New Zealand Women of Influence Award recipients
Scottish emigrants to New Zealand
Alumni of the University of Aberdeen